Henri Bertrand was a Belgian racing cyclist. He won the Belgian national road race title in 1897 and 1898.

References

External links

Year of birth missing
Year of death missing
Belgian male cyclists
Sportspeople from Charleroi
Cyclists from Hainaut (province)